Romeo and Juliet is a 1916 American silent romantic drama film directed by J. Gordon Edwards and starring Theda Bara. The film was based on Shakespeare's Romeo and Juliet and was produced by the Fox Film Corporation. The film was shot at the Fox Studio in Fort Lee, New Jersey, and is now considered to be lost.

Competing versions of Shakespeare
This film and other Shakespeare-oriented pictures were released in 1916, the 300th anniversary of William Shakespeare's death. This film went up against direct competition from another feature-length Romeo and Juliet film from Metro Pictures starring Francis X. Bushman and Beverly Bayne.

In a recorded interview, Bushman states that William Fox had spies working for Metro, and stole some of the intertitles from the Metro version. Fox rushed his version into the theatres in order to capitalize on exhibiting his film  first. Bushman recalled going to see Fox's Romeo and Juliet and was startled to see the intertitles from his film flash on the screen.

Plot summary

Cast
 Theda Bara as Juliet
 Harry Hilliard as Romeo
 Glen White as Mercutio
 Walter Law as Friar Laurence
 John Webb Dillion as Tybalt
 Einar Linden as Paris
 Elwin Eaton as Montague
 Alice Gale as Nurse
 Helen Tracy as Lady Capulet
 Victory Bateman as Lady Montague
 Jane Lee
 Katherine Lee
 May De Lacy
 Edward Holt as Capulet

See also
 Romeo and Juliet on screen
 List of lost films
 1937 Fox vault fire

References

External links

 
 
 
 

1916 films
1916 romantic drama films
1916 lost films
Fox Film films
American black-and-white films
American romantic drama films
American silent feature films
Films based on Romeo and Juliet
Films directed by J. Gordon Edwards
Films shot in Fort Lee, New Jersey
Lost American films
Lost romantic drama films
1910s American films
Silent romantic drama films
Silent horror films
Silent American drama films
1910s English-language films